Christopher John Cron Jr. (born January 5, 1990) is an American professional baseball  first baseman and designated hitter for the Colorado Rockies of Major League Baseball (MLB). He previously played for the Los Angeles Angels, Tampa Bay Rays, Minnesota Twins, and Detroit Tigers. He bats and throws right-handed.

Amateur career
Cron attended Mountain Pointe High School in Phoenix, Arizona, and graduated in 2008. He was drafted by the Chicago White Sox in the 44th round (1320th overall) of the 2008 Major League Baseball draft, but he did not sign, opting to attend college. Cron attended the University of Utah, where he played college baseball for the Utah Utes baseball team.

In 2009, Cron was named a second Team College Freshman All-American and Mountain West Conference (MWC) Freshman of the Year. In 2010, he was named a third Team College All-American, MWC All-Star and MWC Player of the Year. After the 2010 season, he played collegiate summer baseball with the Cotuit Kettleers of the Cape Cod Baseball League. In 2011, Cron led the nation in on-base plus slugging (OPS) (1.320) and slugging percentage, for which he was named a Baseball America All-American.

Professional career

Los Angeles Angels of Anaheim / Los Angeles Angels
The Angels selected Cron in the first round, with the 17th overall selection, of the 2011 Major League Baseball draft. He made his professional debut that season with the Rookie-level Orem Owlz of the Pioneer League that year.

In 2012, Cron played for the Inland Empire 66ers of the Class A-Advanced California League, where he had a .293 batting average with 27 home runs and 123 runs batted in (RBIs). He played for the Arkansas Travelers of the Class AA Texas League in 2013, and hit .274 with 14 home runs and 83 RBIs. Cron began the 2014 season with the Salt Lake Bees of the Class AAA Pacific Coast League. He hit .319 with six home runs and 26 RBIs in 28 games for Salt Lake.

Cron made his Major League Baseball (MLB) debut with the Angels on May 3, 2014. Cron hit his first career major league home run on May 10, in an eventual win against the Toronto Blue Jays. The Angels continued to use Raúl Ibañez as their designated hitter, while Ibañez mentored Cron, in spite of Ibañez's struggles. Following the release of Ibañez on June 21, Cron became the Angels' primary designated hitter as well as playing first base frequently. He finished the season with a .256 batting average and 11 home runs. Cron was the starting DH for the Angels opening day roster in 2015, but was optioned to Triple-A twice during the season. After struggling at the plate and with some nagging injuries, Cron only played in 113 games in 2015 and hit 16 home runs for the Angels.

Cron once again made the team out of spring training in 2016, serving as their DH and occasional first baseman.  On July 2, he had six hits, including two home runs and a double, in a 21–2 defeat of the Boston Red Sox. Cron tied his career high in 2016 with 16 home runs in 116 games, while also hitting .278 with 69 RBI.

The Angels optioned Cron to Salt Lake on May 22, 2017, after enduring a slow start to the season. He was called back up after a month. He finished the season with a .248 average and 16 home runs.

Tampa Bay Rays

On February 17, 2018, the Angels traded Cron to the Tampa Bay Rays in exchange for a player to be named later (Luis Rengifo). On July 9, Cron hit his 17th home run of the season, setting a new career high before the All-Star break. On July 26, Cron hit his 20th home run of the season against the New York Yankees. Cron finished his season with career highs in home runs, hitting 30 over 140 games. He also slashed .253/.323/.493 with 74 runs batted in and finished sixth among designated hitters in wins above replacement.

On November 20, the Rays designated Cron for assignment.

Minnesota Twins 
On November 26, 2018, Cron was claimed off waivers by the Minnesota Twins. In 125 games, Cron hit .253 with 25 home runs and 78 RBI. On December 2, 2019, Cron was non-tendered by Minnesota and became a free agent.

Detroit Tigers
On December 21, 2019, Cron signed a one-year, $6.1 million contract with the Detroit Tigers. On July 24, 2020, Cron made his Tigers debut as Opening Day starting first baseman. On August 15, 2020, it was announced Cron needed season-ending knee surgery. Overall with the 2020 Detroit Tigers, Cron batted .190 with four home runs and 8 RBIs in 13 games.

Colorado Rockies
On February 15, 2021, Cron signed a minor league contract with the Colorado Rockies organization that included an invitation to Spring Training. On March 20, Cron's contract was selected to the 40-man roster. On October 5, 2021, he signed a 2-year, $14.5 million extension with the Rockies. In his first season with the Rockies, Cron batted .281/.375/.530 with 28 home runs and a career-high 92 RBIs and 70 runs scored.

Personal life
Cron is the son of former MLB player Chris Cron.  Cron's younger brother, Kevin, also plays professional baseball. Their cousin, Chad Moeller, also played in MLB.

See also

 List of Major League Baseball single-game hits leaders
 List of people from Fullerton, California
 List of second-generation Major League Baseball players
 List of University of Utah people

References

External links

1990 births
Living people
All-American college baseball players
Arkansas Travelers players
Baseball players from Phoenix, Arizona
Colorado Rockies players
Cotuit Kettleers players
Detroit Tigers players
Inland Empire 66ers of San Bernardino players
Leones del Escogido players
American expatriate baseball players in the Dominican Republic
Los Angeles Angels players
Major League Baseball designated hitters
Major League Baseball first basemen
Mesa Solar Sox players
Minnesota Twins players
National League All-Stars
Orem Owlz players
Salt Lake Bees players
Tampa Bay Rays players
Utah Utes baseball players
Anchorage Glacier Pilots players